Anne-Marie Mouri-Nkeng (born 30 November 1975) is a Cameroonian sprinter. She competed in the women's 4 × 100 metres relay at the 2000 Summer Olympics.

Anne-Marie stayed in Australia post the 2000 Sydney Olympics, residing in Adelaide. On 28 December 2021, Mouri-Nkeng ran 2nd in the prestigious Bay Sheffield 120m Womens final behind Lauren Hewitt before heading over to Tasmania on New Year's Day where she was victorious in the 2002 120m Women's Burnie Gift, becoming the first international & first South Australian based athlete to win the event.

References

1975 births
Living people
Athletes (track and field) at the 2000 Summer Olympics
Cameroonian female sprinters
Olympic athletes of Cameroon
Place of birth missing (living people)
Olympic female sprinters
20th-century Cameroonian women